The Coryphoideae is one of five subfamilies in the palm family, Arecaceae. It contains all of the genera with palmate leaves, excepting Mauritia, Mauritiella and Lepidocaryum, all of subfamily Calamoideae, tribe Lepidocaryeae, subtribe Mauritiinae. However, all Coryphoid palm leaves have induplicate (V-shaped) leaf folds (excepting Guihaia), while Calamoid palms have reduplicate (inverted V-shaped) leaf folds. Pinnate leaves do occur in Coryphoideae, in Phoenix, Arenga, Wallichia and bipinnate in  Caryota.

Classification 
Subfamily Coryphoideae is divided into 8 tribes:

 Sabaleae
 Sabal
 Cryosophileae
 Schippia
 Trithrinax
 Zombia
 Coccothrinax
 Hemithrinax
 Thrinax
 Chelyocarpus
 Cryosophila
 Itaya
 Sabinaria
 Phoeniceae
 Phoenix
 Trachycarpeae
 Chamaerops
 Guihaia
 Trachycarpus
 Rhapidophyllum
 Maxburretia
 Rhapis
 Livistona
 Licuala
 Lanonia
 Johannesteijsmannia
 Pholidocarpus
 Saribus
 Acoelorrhaphe
 Serenoa
 Brahea
 Colpothrinax
 Copernicia
 Pritchardia
 Washingtonia
 Chuniophoeniceae
 Chuniophoenix
 Kerriodoxa
 Nannorrhops
 Tahina
 Caryoteae
 Caryota
 Arenga
 Wallichia
 Corypheae
 Corypha
 Borasseae
 Bismarckia
 Satranala
 Hyphaene
 Medemia
 Latania
 Lodoicea
 Borassodendron
 Borassus

The genus Sabinaria was discovered and described after the classification used here was published, but its morphology clearly places it in tribe Cryosophileae. The genus Saribus was split from Livistona, while Lanonia was split from Licuala, also after publication. Tribe Trachycarpeae was initially described as tribe 'Livistoneae', but the name Trachycarpeae has priority.
Also Uhlia is an extinct genus described from permineralized remains recovered from the Ypresian Princeton Chert in British Columbia, Canada.

References

External links

 
Commelinid subfamilies